This is a list of games created by Maxis. Maxis is an American video game developer that was founded in 1987 and became a division of Electronic Arts (EA) in 1997. Maxis' second software title was the seminal SimCity, a city simulation and planning game. Maxis is the creator of the best-selling PC game of all time, The Sims, and its sequel, The Sims 2.  These three titles and their related products are the brand's most popular and successful lines.

Most of the Maxis titles are simulation-based, though none are considered traditional simulations. Maxis founder Will Wright likens them as "digital dollhouses". Maxis has also released games developed by other production houses, such as A-Train and SimTower.

Games

See also
Electronic Arts
List of Sim video games

External links
Official Maxis website
Maxis at MobyGames

Maxis